Luke Smith is an Australian politician who served as the Mayor of the City of Logan, the seventh largest local government area in Australia by population. From 2006 until 2016, he was the Divisional Councillor for Logan City Council's Division 6.

Elected as an independent in 2016, Smith ran as the Liberal National Party candidate for the Logan-based federal division of Rankin in 2010.

Corruption charges 

On 26 March 2018, Smith was arrested and charged by the Crime and Corruption Commission. The charges include two counts of perjury relating to testimony given to the Commission in 2017, one count of official corruption in his capacity as Mayor of the City of Logan, and one count of failing to properly update his register of interests. The corruption charges relate to Smith's relationship with a property developer who, in addition to donating to Smith's election campaign fund, allegedly provided an illegal contribution to progress the development approval of a Springwood hotel.

10 councillors attended a confidential meeting days after Smith's arrest, in which 8 out 10 agreed to formally ask him to stand aside.  Acting Deputy Mayor Trevina Schwarz confirmed the "vast majority" of councillors decided to "make a formal request to the Mayor to stand aside for a period of three months pending the proceedings."

On 14 April 2019, Smith and 7 other Logan City councillors were charged with fraud by the Crime and Corruption Commission, which alleged they conspired together to terminate the employment of the council's chief executive officer following reports she was privately assisting a corruption investigation. She was formally terminated by council four months after giving information to the state corruption watchdog about alleged possible misconduct by Smith.

While on bail pending the resolution of corruption charges, on 1 May 2019 Smith was further charged with a number of offences including middle-range drink driving, driving without due care and attention, and breaching his bail conditions after an alleged motor vehicle accident. Police held Smith in custody following the alleged incident.

References

Living people
Mayors of places in Queensland
Year of birth missing (living people)